Lucifer was a journal published by Helena Blavatsky. The first edition was issued in September 1887 in London. The journal published articles on philosophical, theosophical, scientific and religious topics. It also contained book reviews, for example of Friedrich Nietzsche's Thus Spoke Zarathustra.

History
The journal was first published by Blavatsky. The first issues were co-edited with Mabel Collins. From 1889 until Blavatsky's death in May 1891 Annie Besant was a co-editor. Besant then published the journal until September 1895, when George Robert Stowe Mead became a co-editor. The journal appeared twelve times a year and was 80 to 90 pages long. The last of twenty volumes was published in August 1897. More than 2800 articles were published in this journal between 1887 and 1897. Then the journal was renamed to The Theosophical Review.

See also 

 "Is Theosophy a Religion?"
 "Philosophers and Philosophicules"
 "The Esoteric Character of the Gospels"
 The Theosophist

References

Sources

External links
 Lucifer reprints 
 Overview 
 Articles from the Lucifer
 Lucifer archive at HathiTrust

Religious magazines published in the United Kingdom
Defunct magazines published in the United Kingdom
Helena Blavatsky
Magazines published in London
Magazines established in 1887
Magazines disestablished in 1897
Mythology magazines
Theosophy
Western esoteric magazines